Lake Sparrow is a mountain tarn in New Zealand's Anatoki Range. It is located within Kahurangi National Park in the South Island's Tasman Region.

Lake Sparrow feeds a small tributary of the Stanley River close to its headwaters above Lake Stanley.

References

External links 
 Tramping tracks around Lake Sparrow

Sparrow